Bourtons is a civil parish in the Cherwell district of Oxfordshire, England, including Great Bourton and Little Bourton.  According to the 2011 census it had a population of 614 across its total area of 6.98 km2.  The villages are about three miles north of Banbury.

Freedom of the Parish
The following people and military units have received the Freedom of the Parish of Bourtons.

Individuals
 Sally Leszczynski: 31 January 2022.

References

External links

Civil parishes in Oxfordshire